MSPP may refer to:

 The Microbee Software Preservation Project
 University of Maryland School of Public Policy
 Massachusetts School of Professional Psychology
 McCourt School of Public Policy at Georgetown University
 Multi-Service Provisioning Platform, see Add-drop multiplexer